Stephania tetrandra is a herbaceous perennial vine of the family Menispermaceae native to China and Taiwan. It grows from a short, woody caudex, climbing to a height of around three meters. The leaves are arranged spirally on the stem, and are peltate, i.e. with the leaf petiole attached near the centre of the leaf. Its root is used in traditional Chinese medicine (TCM).

Distribution and habitat
Stephania tetrandra occurs in shrublands at village margins, open fields, and roadsides in South Central and East China in Anhui, Fujian, Guangdong, Guangxi, Hainan, Hubei, Hunan, Jiangxi, and Zhejiang provinces, and in Taiwan.

Etymology in Chinese medicine
Stephania tetrandra is among the 50 fundamental herbs used in TCM. The standard pinyin according to the Chinese [Herbal] Pharmacopia of the People's Republic of China is: fen fang ji, but it is more commonly known as Han Fang ji.

Traditional medicine
Fen fang ji is used in traditional Chinese medicine to dispel wind and dampness to relieve pain and to promote diuresis.  It is classified as acrid, bitter and cold.  The part used is the root.

Chemistry
Stephania contains tetrandrine, a potent smooth muscle relaxant.  Stephania alkaloids have curare-like action, and can selectively inhibit T-cell-dependent immune reactions. The root contains many isoquinoline alkaloids: tetrandrine (0.6-0.9%), fangchinoline (0.5%), cyclanoline (0.1%) and dimethyltetrandrine iodide (muscle relaxant). The root also contains flavanoids. The main active alkaloids are: tetrandrine (12 to 23 grams/kg) and fangchinoline (0.3–3 mg/kg). Also present are: dimethyltetradine iodide, cyclanoline, menisine, menisidine, oxofangchirine, stephenanthrine, stepholidine and bisbenzylisoquinoline. Fenfangjines F, G, H, and I.

Other herbs sometimes used as Fang Ji
Other plants named fang ji (roughly "snakebite remedy") are sometimes substituted for it. Notable among these is guang fang ji, Aristolochia fanchi, whose main toxic component is aristolochic acid, a potent carcinogen and nephrotoxin. Other herbs sometimes used as Fang Ji include Cocculus trilobus, C. orbiculatus, Aristolochia fangchi, and Sinomenium acutum (Japanese Han Fang Ji or Qinfengteng).

Warnings, contraindications for substituted herbs
When Aristolochia fanghi is substituted for Stephania tetrandra, the resultant guang fang ji preparations can contain toxic amounts of aristolochic acid  Ingestion can lead to renal failure and even death; Aristolochia is used in TCM only with great caution. In May, 2000, the FDA began detaining any plants or medicines suspected of containing aristolochic acid, unless laboratory testing indicated they were negative for aristolochic acid.  The traditional route of ingestion of guang fang ji is via water decoction.  Since aristolochic acid has low water solubility, water decoction is believed to be a safer route than taking guang fang ji as an uncooked powder.

References

External links
 
 Stephania and Chinese Herb Nephropathy

Medicinal plants
tetrandra
Plants used in traditional Chinese medicine
Flora of China
Flora of Taiwan